Suman Sahai is an Indian activist and the founder of Gene Campaign.

Career
Sahai obtained a Ph.D. from the Indian Agricultural Research Institute in 1975. She then successively worked at the University of Alberta, University of Chicago, and the University of Heidelberg, where she obtained her habilitation in human genetics. According to the Web of Science, Sahai has published over 40 articles, mostly on policy issues relating to genetically modified organisms, which have been cited about 200 times, giving her an h-index of 9. She is director of the NGO, Gene Campaign.

Awards
 Order of the Golden Ark, 2001
 Borlaug Award, 2004
 Padma Shri, 2011

Plagiarism
In April 2013, Sahai was shown to have committed plagiarism in her habilitation thesis, which had been submitted to the University of Heidelberg in 1986. In addition, she was accused of presenting herself as being or having been a professor at that University, without ever actually having occupied such a position. On 14 April 2013, the University of Heidelberg confirmed that plagiarism had taken place, that Sahai has no right to call herself a professor of the University of Heidelberg, and that in consequence Sahai had agreed to renounce her venia legendi. , Sahai's short bio at the World Academy of Art and Science still lists her as "Professor of Genetics, University of Heidelberg".

See also
 Scientific misconduct

References

Living people
Year of birth missing (living people)
20th-century Indian biologists
20th-century Indian chemists
Academic scandals
Anti-GMO activists
Heidelberg University
Indian agriculturalists
Indian biochemists
Indian women activists
Indian women biochemists
People involved in plagiarism controversies
People involved in scientific misconduct incidents
Recipients of the Padma Shri in science & engineering